This is a list of the officially accredited Battle of Britain units with their aircraft types, code letters, call signs and casualties.

On 9 November 1960, the Air Ministry published Air Ministry Order N850 which officially defined the qualifications for aircrew to be classified as having participated in the Battle of Britain. The AMO also defined the squadrons that were deemed to have fought in the battle under the control of RAF Fighter Command between 0001 hours on 10 July and 2359 hours on 31 October 1940; the official beginning and end of the battle.

A total of 71 squadrons and other units from Fighter Command, Coastal Command and the Fleet Air Arm are listed.

Accredited squadrons

See also

Royal Air Force

List of Royal Air Force aircraft squadrons
List of Royal Air Force aircraft independent flights
List of conversion units of the Royal Air Force
List of Royal Air Force Glider units
List of Royal Air Force Operational Training Units
List of Royal Air Force schools
List of Royal Air Force units & establishments
List of RAF squadron codes
List of RAF Regiment units
List of wings of the Royal Air Force
Royal Air Force roundels

Army Air Corps

List of Army Air Corps aircraft units

Fleet Air Arm

List of Fleet Air Arm aircraft squadrons
List of Fleet Air Arm groups
List of aircraft units of the Royal Navy
List of aircraft wings of the Royal Navy

Others

List of Air Training Corps squadrons
University Air Squadron
Air Experience Flight
Volunteer Gliding Squadron
United Kingdom military aircraft serial numbers
United Kingdom aircraft test serials
British military aircraft designation systems

References
Notes

Bibliography
 Ramsay, Winston (editor). The Battle of Britain Then and Now Mk V. London: Battle of Britain Prints International Ltd, 1989.

External links
 BattleofBritain.com  – Retrieved: 4 August 2007.
Battle of Britain at RAF website

Britain squadrons
Britain squadrons
Wor
Battle of Britain squadrons